WNRA may refer to:

 WNRA-LP, a low-power radio station (94.5 FM) licensed to serve Hawk Pride, Alabama, United States
 WULA, a defunct radio station (1240 AM) formerly licensed to serve Eufaula, Alabama